The 1992 Arab Cup Final was a football match that took place on 11 September 1992, at the Al-Hamadaniah Stadium in Aleppo, Syria, to determine the winner of the 1992 Arab Cup and simultaneously the gold medal of 1992 Pan Arab Games.
Egypt defeated Saudi Arabia 3–2 to win their first Arab Cup and their third gold medal at the Pan Arab Games.

Road to the final

Match

Details

References

External links
1992 Arab Cup / Pan Arab Games - rsssf.com

F
1992
F
F
Nations
Nations
International association football competitions hosted by Syria
Egypt national football team matches
Saudi Arabia national football team matches
September 1992 sports events in Asia
20th century in Aleppo